Planchonia grandis grows as a tree up to  tall, with a trunk diameter of up to .  The bark is reddish brown, grey or white. The flowers are greenish white. Habitat is lowland and mangrove forest. P. grandis is found in Sumatra, Peninsular Malaysia and Borneo.

References

grandis
Plants described in 1912
Trees of Sumatra
Trees of Peninsular Malaysia
Trees of Borneo